The Great Britain men's national Australian rules football team is known as the Great Britain Bulldogs. The team is made up of the best British born players selected from clubs of in England, Wales and Scotland, and occasional appearances from British players playing for clubs in Australia. In AFL Europe, separate national teams represent England, Wales and Scotland.

As well as regular international friendlies, the team has played in every Australian Football International Cup since its inception in 2002.

They also compete at the triennial AFL Europe Championship, winning the 2016 edition in London after beating the Irish Warriors 7.9 (51) to 4.5 (29).

The Great Britain women's national Australian rules football team are called the Great Britain Swans.

History 

The first team to represent Great Britain in Australian rules was the British Lions during the 1888 British Lions tour to New Zealand and Australia. The team played 19 matches of Australian rules winning six and drawing one. A standout for the team was Andrew Stoddart. However following the tour the codes had diverged to a point that it was felt that such exchanges could not continue and Australia's policy was not to compete internationally in the sport. 

The Great Britain Bulldogs played their first international on 2 October 1993 against Canada in Toronto.

They competed at the 2001 Atlantic Alliance Cup, recording wins over Canada and eventual runners-up Denmark. Great Britain's Best and Fairest player was Tyrone Hallam.

In 2002, the Great Britain Bulldogs competed at the first ever Australian Football International Cup in Australia, finishing sixth. Three years later they also finished sixth at the 2005 tournament.

In October 2005, the Bulldogs played against Ireland in a curtain raiser at the West Coast Eagles vs Fremantle exhibition match at the Oval in London. After this match head coach Matt Connell handed over the coaching role to Charlie Kielty.

In October 2006, the Great Britain vs Ireland fixture was repeated before the Geelong Football Club vs Port Adelaide Power match.

After coach Charlie Kielty resigned in late 2009, Mark Pitura became head coach, with Rob Fielder as assistant. The first test was against a travelling Denmark Vikings squad, which resulted in an 11.10 (76) to 9.9 (63) win for the Bulldogs on Putney Heath, London.

In 2010, the squad competed in the inaugural European Championships in Denmark and Sweden. The squad achieved a credible 4th place, losing out to losing finalists Denmark in the group and co-hosts Sweden in the qualification final. Three Bulldogs were named in the Team of the Tournament. These players were Adam Bennett (Reading Kangaroos), Martyn Hinchey (Southampton Titans) and Gareth Blackstaffe-Turner (Wimbledon Hawks).

At the 2011 International Cup, Paul Harris from the Putney Magpies captained the squad to a seventh-place finish. Brendan McGeever (North London Lions), Ian Mitchell (Wolverhampton Wolves) and Paul Francis (Wimbledon Hawks) served as vice-captains.

A marked improvement in performance culminated in a fantastic performance at the 2013 AFL Europe Championships, where the squad finished as runners-up to hosts Ireland.

In 2014 the Bulldogs once again travelled to the AFL International Cup and were placed in Pool A alongside Ireland, Nauru, Fiji, France and Indonesia. Victories over France and Fiji were achieved and Great Britain finished 9th overall, defeating Fiji 5.7 (37) to 2.7 (19) in the Qualification Final.

2016 was a successful year for the Bulldogs as they became champions of Europe for the first time. The bulldogs defeated Ireland 7.9 (51) to 4.5 (29). Six players made the team of the tournament. These were Luke Booth (Huddersfield Rams), Marc Cashman (Wimbledon Hawks), Jack Coughlan (North London Lions), Myles Hudson (Wimbledon Hawks), Michael Sharp (North London Lions) and Andrew Walkden (Manchester Mosquitoes).

At the 2017 version of the AFL International Cup, Will Worthington captained the squad and was assisted by Luke Booth and Sean Walton as Vice-Captains. The Bulldogs finished in a joint-highest position of six.

As of February 2018, Ross Denton, formerly of Birmingham University and currently playing for the North London Lions, was appointed captain of the Great Britain Bulldogs.

International competition

International Cup

AFL Europe Championship

Results (2010-present) 
Scores and results list Great Britain's points tally first.

2010

2011

2012

2013

2014

2015

2016

2017

2018

See also 
Australian rules football in England
Australian rules football in Scotland
Australian rules football in Wales
Australian Football International Cup

References

External links 

Australian rules football in Great Britain
National Australian rules football teams
Australian rules football